Discography for the experimental music group Bull of Heaven. As of December 2022, they have 526 releases all in total.

Numbered releases (2008-2016)
 001: Weed Problem (2008)
 002: He Is Not Dead, But Sleepeth (2008)
 003: Eleven Floors Down (2008)
 004: Reasoning in State Hospital (2008)
 005: A Lovely Pear (2008)
 006: The Myth of Dinosaurs (2008)
 007: Reptilian Takeover (2008)
 008: A Wall Between Two Gardens (2008)
 009: First Our Pleasures Die (2008)
 010: A White Surveillance Van (2008)
 011: Spacewalking Your New Way Home (2008)
 012: Timeship 2012 (2008)
 013: Elsa, Are You in There? (2008)
 014: Upon One Pair of English Legs (2008)
 015: Sun Ritual (2008)
 016: Get Tree Body (Brainwash Solution) (2008)
 017: Its Bones Are Soft (2008)
 018: Candles Green, Heads and Skulls (2008)
 019: Hypnosis, Drugs, and Mind Control (The Beginning: A Touch) (2008)
 020: Legend of Degree (2008)
 021: A Series of Elaborate Precautions (2008)
 022: Man-Lizards, Masters of Venus (2008)
 023: Odd Things, Brick Buildings (2008)
 024: Some Vast Unknown (2008)
 025: Tale of an Earth Man (2008)
 026: A Curious Picture You See With Your Eyes Closed (2008)
 027: Spirits Clad in Veils (2008)
 028: Even to the Edge of Doom (2008)
 029: Lions on a Banner (2008) 
 030: In That Shadow Lurks a Smile (2008) 
 031: Babylonian Mathematics (2008) 
 032: There Is Nothing Hidden That Will Not Be Revealed Pt. 1 (2008) 
 033: There Is Nothing Hidden That Will Not Be Revealed Pt. 2 (2008)
 034: There Is Nothing Hidden That Will Not Be Revealed Pt. 3 (2008)
 035: There Is Nothing Hidden That Will Not Be Revealed Pt. 4 (2008)
 036: As Two From Ten Thousand Pt. 1 (2008) 
 037: As Two From Ten Thousand Pt. 2 (2008) 
 038: A Foot in Place of a Foot (2008) 
 039: Become Smaller and Smaller (2008) 
 040: A Beautiful Dog (2008)
 041: By What Eternal Streams (2008) 
 042: Pre-Human Spawn of Cthulhu (2008) 
 043: He Is Cruel and Moves With Great Cunning (2008) 
 044: A Corpse in My Arms on Awakening (2008) 
 045: The Wicked Cease From Struggling (2008) 
 046: In All Creatures Are Lust and Hunger (2008) 
 047: At One With Their Antagonists (2008) 
 048: Foreign Ideas, Alien Philosophies (2008) 
 049: The Abyss of the Human Species (2008) 
 050: Far From the Black Ocean (2008) 
 051: Our Light Is a Voice (2008) 
 052: Without Hope, a Mute Offender (2008) 
 053: La Tristesse Durera Toujours (2008) 
 054: Guns, Girls, Psychoactive Drugs (Birth and Redeath) (2009) 
 055: A Killer's Apology Rebuffed (The Destroyer) (2009)
 056: Return of Ghost Sheriff (Werewolves Are Chasing Me) (2009)
 057: Narcolepsy: An Introduction (2009)
 058: Narcolepsy: Dreamtime Collapsing (2009)
 059: Narcolepsy: Four Thousand BC (2009) 
 060: Narcolepsy: Melting (2009)
 061: Inflame Thyself in Praying Pt. 1 (2009)
 062: Inflame Thyself in Praying Pt. 2 (2009)
 063: Inflame Thyself in Praying Pt. 3 (2009)
 064: Inflame Thyself in Praying Pt. 4 (2009)
 065: Inflame Thyself in Praying Pt. 5 (2009)
 066: Inflame Thyself in Praying Pt. 6 (2009)
 067: Inflame Thyself in Praying Pt. 7 (2009)
 068: Inflame Thyself in Praying Pt. 8 (2009)
 069: Inflame Thyself in Praying Pt. 9 (2009)
 070: Inflame Thyself in Praying Pt. 10 (2009)
 071: Inflame Thyself in Praying Pt. 11 (2009)
 072: Inflame Thyself in Praying Pt. 12 (2009)
 073: Inflame Thyself in Praying Pt. 13 (2009)
 074: He Dwells on the Shores of the Sea Pt. 1 (2009)
 075: He Dwells on the Shores of the Sea Pt. 2 (2009)
 076: Mysterious Signals From Glowing Orbs (2009)
 077: The End of the World Must Be Coming (2009)
 078: Objective Contempt, Objective Conscience (2009)
 079: Praise to Our Common-Father-Endlessness (2009) 
 080: Your Way and Your Face Are Stainless (2009)
 081: You Took Dead Bones and You Covered Them With Bodies (2009)
 082: His Tail Dragged a Third of the Stars of Heaven (2009)
 083: A Great Fire-Red Dragon With Seven Heads and Ten Horns (2009)
 084: The Marchers With Left Leg Extended (2009)
 085: Die, Patriarch! The Screams of Infancy (2009)
 086: The Longest Distance Between Two Places (2009)
 087: A Half-Grown Boy in Sea Clothes (2009)
 088: Death With Every Step (2009)
 089: Death Had Taken Them, One by One (2009)
 090: Death in Our Pockets (2009) 
 091: Up to the Rim of the Hollow (2009)
 092: The Long Count (2009)
 093: They Found Her Footprints There (2009)
 094: In Human Form This Fiend to Slay (2009)
 095: Unity Exists in the Categories (2009)
 096: This Is the Primal Identity (2009)
 097: A Perspective, Not the Truth (2009)
 098: The Final Mystery Is Oneself (2009)
 099: Quetzalcoatl and the Ancient Astronauts (2009)
 100: The Thought That Counts (2009) 
 101: Like the First Pine Cone (2009)
 102: Criminals, Fair and True (2009)
 103: Her Name Is Unending (2009)
 104: You Are the Poltergeist (2009)
 105: I'm Not Here Anymore (2009)
 106: Let's Murder the Neighbors (2009)
 107: Axiom of Choice (2009)
 108: Did You Know That the Bible Have the Answers? (2009)
 109: Boxes of Scorpions Released by Tripwire (2009)
 110: Superstring Theory Refuted (2009)
 111: Superstring Theory Verified (2009)
 112: Conquer! That Is Enough (2009)
 113: The Light Higher Than Eyesight (2009)
 114: Come Forth, O Children, Under the Stars (2009)
 115: Swift as a Trodden Serpent Turn and Strike! (2009)
 116: Rituals of the Elements and Feasts of the Times (2009)
 117: Change Not as Much as the Style of a Letter (2009)
 118: The Chosen Priest and Apostle of Infinite Space (2009)
 119: Slippery Buttons, Live in the Upper World, 2003 (2009)
 120: Everywhere Is Violence (The Machine Is Killing the Babies) (2009)
 121: O Nobly-Born, They Are Not Really Precipices (2009)
 122: Drums and Thigh-Bone Trumpets, Skull-Timbrels (2009) 
 123: Eighty Thousand Species of Mischievous Sprites (2009)
 124: Be Not Daunted Thereby, Nor Terrified, Nor Awed (2009)
 125: The City Freezing (2009)
 126: The White Ivy (2009)
 127: We Seem to Share Your Distress (2010)
 128: Approaching Them in the Darkness (2010) 
 129: Between Them and Us Stands Our Fear (2010) 
 130: A Slow and Painful Execution (2010) 
 131: Loaded With Buckshot (2010) 
 132: What Filthy Rotten Blood (2010) 
 133: On Wednesday Morning, When the Truck Rolls In (2010) 
 134: Lingering Under the Remainder of Her Disease (2010) 
 135: Under This Umbrella of Satanism (2010) 
 136: The Use of Obsessive Defenses (2010)
 137: The Meaning of Hysterical Symptoms (2010)
 138: You Feel a Stillness All Around You, Caressing Your Face (2010) 
 139: My Doctor Gave Me Some (2010) 
 140: And Never Will (2010) 
 141: Creation of Strange Matter (2010) 
 142: Qualia and the Dynamic Core (2010) 
 143: The Hollow Booming of Pieces of Ordnance (2010) 
 144: Poured Onto That Marble Slab (2010) 
 145: Note Notes, Forsooth, and Nothing! (2010) 
 146: Vicious, Cruel, Incapable of Remorse (2010) 
 147: The Most Merciful Thing That a Family Does (2010) 
 148: And Madly Hangs the Grass With Silver Rags (2010) 
 149: Still in My Thought That Lovely Image Breathes (2010) 
 150: With Bare Feet I Trod Upon Thorns and Flints (2010) 
 151: Pleasure Alone Lends Value to Existence (2010) 
 152: The Last Example of These Unclean Horrors (2010) 
 153: The Branch of Gold Consecrated to the Subterranean Goddess (2010) 
 154: In the Form of the Question Concerning the Thingness of Things (2010) 
 155: They Sacrificed Their Sons and Their Daughters Unto Devils (2010) 
 156: Crime and Infamy Have a Right of Asylum Here (2010) 
 157: Fairer Yet Through Sorrow and Separation (2010) 
 158: Prosperity Is Here. Stay With Us, Angel! (2010) 
 159: White as the Petals of Some Water Flower (2010) 
 160: Your Best Loved and Always Known Must Leave (2010) 
 161: Her Song Trembling the Twigs and Small Branches (2010) 
 162: In Their Terror Capable of Anything Pt. 1 (2010) 
 163: In Their Terror Capable of Anything Pt. 2 (2010) 
 164: Regrets Take the Place of Dreams (2010) 
 165: Out of the Nothing Beyond the Lake (2010) 
 166: When the World Is Puddle-Wonderful (2010) 
 167: Isolated Regions of the Human Soul (2010) 
 168: Go With Fiends in That Everlasting Fire (2010) 
 169: Alas! Thy Foul Will Hath Wrought My Woe (2010) 
 170: Low Is the Covering, Unhigh the Sidewalls (2010) 
 171: Buried in a Deep Pit, in a Doorless House (2010) 
 172: Thus Are These Children Filled With Torment (2010) 
 173: Sharp She Was and Keen, and Pleased the Devil (2010) 
 174: It Was Not Known to Thee More Than to Thy Kin (2010) 
 175: Thou Lovedst the Traitors That Were Hateful to God (2010) 
 176: Well Away! And Woe Is Me! That I Ever Came to Thee (2010) 
 177: Then Is That Wretched Life Ended All With Sad Departure (2010) 
 178: For the Devil Taught Thee All, Chief Full Nigh Thy Heart (2010) 
 179: Worms Have Shared Them, Gnawed Their Miserable Bones (2010) 
 180: Now Is Thy Mouth Prevented, for Death Has Closed It (2010) 
 181: All Rueful Is Thy Lot, After Thy Wicked Life (2010) 
 182: When Death, With His Dart, Pineth the Body (2010) 
 183: Victim Accursed, Extend Thy Throat for My Knives (2010) 
 184: Mayst Thou Fall by the Fires of the Heavenly Avenger (2010) 
 185: Submission to Leaders, Hostility to Outsiders (2010) 
 186: A Donkey's Head Sold for Eighty Shekels of Silver (2010) 
 187: Never Mind the Fallibility of All the Human Beings (2010) 
 188: Showering the Rank, Furry Body All Over the Tent (2010) 
 189: From the Threshing Floor? From the Winepress? (2010)
 190: Our Preferences Do Not Determine What's True (2010) 
 191: With a Sudden Jerk and Involuntary Gesture (2010) 
 192: May God Deal With Me, Be It Ever So Severely (2010) 
 193: Look Death in the Eye and Be Grateful (2010) 
 194: Give Up Your Son So We May Eat Him (2010) 
 195: We Know Who Speaks for the Nations (2010) 
 196: Incoherently Babbling Self-Accusations (2010) 
 197: When the Messenger Comes, Shut the Door (2010) 
 198: A Faint Sensation of a Distant Memory (2010) 
 199: Ere I Forget, or Die, or Move Away (2010) 
 200: So We Cooked My Son and Ate Him (2010) 
 201: How Strangely Still the Water Is Today (2010) 
 202: The Things That Hide in You Come Out Again (2010) 
 203: Like Vast Serpents Infold Around My Limbs (2010) 
 204: For Idle Dreams of Things Which Cannot Be (2010) 
 205: Of What Far Sea Upon What Unknown Ground (2010) 
 206: Like Waters Flowing in the River's Course (2010) 
 207: I Watched You Enter Your Home From Inside a Dumpster (2010) 
 208: As You Etch on the Inner Window of Your Eye (2010) 
 209: Blurred With Tears and Suffering Beyond Hope (2010) 
 210: Like a Wall in Which an Insect Lives and Gnaws (2010)
 211: With Muffled Sound Obliterating Everything (2010)
 212: You Went to Meet the Shell's Embrace of Fire (2010)
 213: Studying the Building From the Changing Angle (2010)
 214: Modern Man Is Helpless When Confronted With Death (2010) 
 215: And the Bones and the Sinews Were Polished by the Wear (2010) 
 216: Peripatetics and Epicureans Held Very Varying Views (2010) 
 217: The Mongols Were Pagan, Neither Moslem Nor Christian (2010) 
 218: Apparent Uncertainty Among National Security Experts (2010) 
 219: Swift Glances of Caution at the Hurrying Pedestrians (2010)
 220: Advantages of Making Regular Use of Cleansing Products (2010) 
 221: The Usual Manifestations of Suspicion Were Heightened (2011) 
 222: What Strikes the Oyster Shell Does Not Damage the Pearl (2011) 
 223: There Is More Passing in Their Minds Than We Are Aware Of (2011) 
 224: A Strife of Interests Masquerading as a Contest of Principles (2011) 
 225: When Hostilities Shall Cease on the Part of the Aggressors (2011) 
 226: Stationary If All Statistics Are Invariant Under a Shift in Time (2011) 
 227: Szeretlek, Te Mocskos Kis Kurva! (2011) 
 228: Above the Poor Neglected Graves (2011)
 229: I Brought a Heart Into the Room (2011)
 230: From the Garden of the Sun (2011)
 231: Three Hundred Winters (2011) 
 232: At the Tide's Edge, I Lie (2011) 
 233: Plucked for the Breast of the Dead (2011) 
 234: And I Talk to Them in My Secret Mind (2011) 
 235: In the Conscious Sea, Roused and Prolonged (2011) 
 236: Pitiless Light Over the Stony Landscape (2011) 
 237: Disordered Before the Naked Picture of Despair (2011) 
 238: 2 (2011)
 239: lcm(2,3) (2011) 
 240: lcm(2,3,5) (2011) 
 241: lcm(2,3,5,7) (2011) 
 242: lcm(2,3,5,7,11) (2011) 
 243: lcm(2,3,5,7,11,13) (2011) 
 244: lcm(2,3,5,7,11,13,17) (2011) 
 245: lcm(2,3,5,7,11,13,17,19) (2011) 
 246: lcm(2,3,5,7,11,13,17,19,23) (2011) 
 247: lcm(2,3,5,7,11,13,17,19,23,29) (2011) 
 248: lcm(2,3,5,7,11,13,17,19,23,29,31) (2011) 
 249: lcm(2,3,5,7,11,13,17,19,23,29,31,37) (2011) 
 250: lcm(2,3,5,7,11,13,17,19,23,29,31,37,41) (2011) 
 251: lcm(2,3,5,7,11,13,17,19,23,29,31,37,41,43) (2011) 
 252: lcm(2,3,5,7,11,13,17,19,23,29,31,37,41,43,47) (2011) 
 253: lcm(2,3,5,7,11,13,17,19,23,29,31,37,41,43,47,53) (2011) 
 254: lcm(2,3,5,7,11,13,17,19,23,29,31,37,41,43,47,53,59) (2011) 
 255: lcm(2,3,5,7,11,13,17,19,23,29,31,37,41,43,47,53,59,61) (2011) 
 256: lcm(2,3,5,7,11,13,17,19,23,29,31,37,41,43,47,53,59,61,67) (2011) 
 257: lcm(2,3,5,7,11,13,17,19,23,29,31,37,41,43,47,53,59,61,67,71) (2011) 
 258: lcm(2,3,5,7,11,13,17,19,23,29,31,37,41,43,47,53,59,61,67,71,73) (2011) 
 259: lcm(2,3,5,7,11,13,17,19,23,29,31,37,41,43,47,53,59,61,67,71,73,79) (2011) 
 260: lcm(2,3,5,7,11,13,17,19,23,29,31,37,41,43,47,53,59,61,67,71,73,79,83) (2011) 
 261: A Feeling for the Order Lying Behind the Appearance (2011) 
 262: The Insistence on Small Miracles (2011)
 263: Internet Handle for a Thirteen Year Old Girl (2011) 
 264: The Sun Itself Sees Not Till Heaven Clears (2011)
 265: Interpret the World According to Certain Patterns (2011) 
 266: An Incestuous Act That God Committed Upon Reality (2011) 
 267: We Shall Draw From the Heart of Suffering (2011) 
 268: Persist Without Solace, Without Illusion (2011)
 269: Have the Gates of Death Been Opened Unto Thee? (2011) 
 270: Hast Thou Seen the Doors of the Shadow of Death? (2011) 
 271: An Itemized Account of the American Failure (2011) 
 272: O Pleasing Death Come With Your Terrible Hands (2011) 
 273: Whispering to Myself Delicious, Terrible Things (2011) 
 274: Their Cow Calveth, and Casteth Not Her Calf (2011) 
 275: The Snow and the Little Wood Under the Blue Sky (2011) 
 276: In My Old Griefs, and With My Childhood's Faith (2011) 
 277: The Nerve Center of Wisdom and the Knower (2011) 
 278: Because of the Emptiness of the Heart (2011) 
 279: Full of Craters and Frozen Lights (2011)
 280: You Were Shown a Diagram (2011) 
 281: Heroes, Heroines, Celestial Warriors (2011) 
 282: One Continuous Stream of Vibrations (2011)
 283: The Blood Beneath My Skin (2011) 
 284: One Hour of Fire, and Let All Be Ended! (2011) 
 285: A Violet Breath (2011) 
 286: 0 (2011) 
 287: n (2011) 
 288: Four Years Ago? Opium. (2012) 
 289: CALCULOR (2012)
 290: Two-Legged Tigers and Crocodiles (2012)
 291: Reduction to Elementary Particles and Radiation (2013)
 292: Human Dignity in Times of Great Suffering and Loss (2013)
 293: The Ruin and Absence of the World (2013)
 294: Driven By the Warmth and Force of the Imagination (2013)
 295: Reduced to a Square of Planed Wood (2013)
 296: Down the Polished Edge of the Dead Man's Desk (2013)
 297: I Cut the Liver Out of a Drifter (2013)
 298: Your Fault Deserveth, I May Pierce Ye (2013)
 299: Self-Traitor, I Do Bring the Spider Love (2013)
 300: Songs for Girls (2014)
 301: Weed Problem II - V (2014)
 302: It is Part of Space and Time (2014)
 303: n(k) (2014)
 304: 0(2^18x5^18) (2014)
 305: Hostages are Human Beings (2014)
 306: It is Not a Lack of Love (2014)
 307: x0(2^18×5^18)p (2014)
 308: Px0(2^18×5^18)p*k (2014)
 309: ΣPx0(2^18×5^18)p*k*k (2014)
 310: ΩΣPx0(2^18×5^18)p*k*k*k (2014)
 311: Night's Great Perimeter (2014)
 312: The Shadow of a Fleeting Dream (2014)
 313: In the Lining of Your Skin (2014)
 314: Saints and Angels and Martyrs and Holy Men (2014)
 315: In Walked Orson (2014)
 316:  (2014)
 317: My Concerns are Global (2014)
 318: Where the Dead Men Lost Their Bones (2014)
 319: The Person Witness (2014)
 320: Following the Sand (2014)
 321: Burn Dark Sincere Receiver (2014)
 322: Scoundrel, Rogue, Monster (2014)
 323: Killing, Dressing, Preparing Their Own Oxen and Swine (2014)
 324: To Sit on the Night of Sadness (2014)
 325: I Sent Myself to the Law (2015)
 326: I Hope You Feel the Hopelessness (2015)
 327: Elementary Machine Life (2015)
 328: In Your Soft Authority (2015)
 329: She Is as the Nights Are Horrible, Pt. 1 (2015)
 330: She Is as the Nights Are Horrible, Pt. 2 (2015)
 331: A Ghost Prehistoric, Pt. 1 (2015)
 332: A Ghost Prehistoric, Pt. 2 (2015)
 333: Of Course, the Personality Is Gone (2015)
 334: It Is the Parabola (2015)
 335: You Can't Buy Shoes in a Painting (2015)
 336: Lorne Greene's Belgian Woodchuck Orgy (2015)
 337: On Her Lips a Poison (2015)
 338: Good Night, Sweet Prince, Vol. 1 (2015)
 339: Good Night, Sweet Prince, Vol. 2 (2015)
 340: Good Night, Sweet Prince, Vol. 3 (2015)
 341: Good Night, Sweet Prince, Vol. 4 (2015)
 342: Good Night, Sweet Prince, Vol. 5 (2015)
 343: Virtue's Light, That Beams Beyond the Spheres (2015)
 344: I Will Climb Alone (2015)
 345: Moog Variations, Vol. 1 (2015)
 346: Moog Variations, Vol. 2 (2015)
 347: Moog Variations, Vol. 3 (2015)
 348: Moog Variations, Vol. 4 (2015)
 349: Moog Variations, Vol. 5 (2015)
 350: Moog Variations, Vol. 6 (2015)
 351: Total Bliss (2016)
 352: Future Available Pamphlet (2016)
 353: To Fill the Mouth of Their Monster (2016)

Roman numeral series (2009)
 I (2009)
 II (2009)
 III (2009)
 IV (2009)
 V (2009)
 VI (2009)
 VII (2009)
 VIII (2009)
 IX (2009)
 X (2009)
 XI (2009)
 XII (2009)
 XIII (2009)
 XIV (2009)
 XV (2009)
 XVI (2009)
 XVII (2009)
 XVIII (2009)
 XIX (2009)
 XX (2009)
 XXI (2009)
 XXII (2009)
 XXIII (2009)
 XXIV (2009)
 XXV (2009)
 XXVI (2009)
 XXVII (2009)
 XXVIII (2009)
 XXIX (2009)
 XXX (2009)
 XXXI (2009)
 XXXII (2009)
 XXXIII (2009)
 XXXIV (2009)
 XXXV (2009)
 XXXVI (2009)
 XXXVII (2009)
 XXXVIII (2009)
 XXXIX (2009)
 XL (2009)
 XLI (2009)
 XLII (2009)
 XLIII (2009)
 XLIV (2009)
 XLV (2009)
 XLVI (2009)
 XLVII (2009)
 XLVIII (2009)
 XLIX (2009)
 L (2009)
 LI (2009)
 LII (2009)
 LIII (2009)
 LIV (2009)
 LV (2009)
 LVI (2009)
 LVII (2009)
 LVIII (2009)
 LIX (2009)
 LX (2009)
 LXI (2009)
 LXII (2009)
 LXIII (2009)
 LXIV (2009)
 LXV (2009)
 LXVI (2009)
 LXVII (2009)
 LXVIII (2009)
 LXIX (2009)
 LXX (2009)
 LXXI (2009)
 LXXII (2009)
 LXXIII (2009)
 LXXIV (2009)
 LXXV (2009)
 LXXVI (2009)
 LXXVII (2009)
 LXXVIII (2009)
 LXXIX (2009)
 LXXX (2009)
 LXXXI (2009)
 LXXXII (2009)
 LXXXIII (2009)
 LXXXIV (2009)
 LXXXV (2009)
 LXXXVI (2009)
 LXXXVII (2009)
 LXXXVIII (2009)
 LXXXIX (2009)
 XC (2009)
 XCI (2009)
 XCII (2009)
 XCIII (2009)
 XCIV (2009)
 XCV (2009)
 XCVI (2009)
 XCVII (2009)
 XCVIII (2009)
 XCIX (2009)
 C (2009)

Aleph series (2009-2011)
 Aleph0 (ℵ0) (2009)
 Aleph1 (ℵ1) (2009)
 Aleph2 (ℵ2) (2009)
 Aleph3 (ℵ3) (2009)
 Aleph4 (ℵ4) (2009)
 Aleph5 (ℵ5) (2009)
 Aleph6 (ℵ6) (2009) 
 Aleph7 (ℵ7) (2009) 
 Aleph8 (ℵ8) (2009) 
 Aleph9 (ℵ9) (2009) 
 Aleph10 (ℵ10) (2010) 
 Aleph11 (ℵ11) (2011)

Untitled series (2010)
 Untitled1 (2010)
 Untitled2 (2010)
 Untitled3 (2010)
 Untitled4 (2010)
 Untitled5 (2010)
 Untitled6 (2010)
 Untitled7 (2010)
 Untitled8 (2010)
 Untitled9 (2010)
 Untitled10 (2010)

Non-numbered other releases
 Lemniscate 1 (2013)
 Incalzando (2013)
 Imperioso (2013)
 Irato (2013)
 Insistendo (2013)
 Duolo (2013)
 Quasi Una Fantasia (2013)
 Quos Amor Verus Tenuit Tenebit (2013)
 Ex Oblivione (2013)
 Ex Silentio (2013)
 Ex Umbra in Solem (2013)
 Non Omnis Moriar (2013)
 Omnibus Locis Fit Caedes (2013)
 Extinctus Amabitur Idem (2013)
 Sic Faciunt Omnes (2013)
 Z (2013)
 Fight Night For The Ghosts Of Heaven (2018)
 The Deathless Element (2019)
 In the House of Dust (2020)
 Quest for the Fountain of Apologies (2020)
 It's Jaws and Humming, Like Dancing, Like Glass (2020)
 Driftwood and Bone (2020)
 It Can't Be Just You Who Eats (2020)
 Howling (2020)
 A Standard Smile (2020)
 Distant Spring (2020)
 Memories Misremembered (2020)
 Phantom on Your Shoulder (2020)
 Appear/Not Appear (2020)
 It Is Not Nothing (2020)
 nice shirt (2021)
 Hidden Signs/Secret Meanings (2021)
 Folded Hands (2021)
 19 nervous breakdowns (I'm about to have) (2021)
 say it again (2021)
 a thoughtless gift (2021)
 things that are lost (2021)
 Who Will Watch Over Me (2021)
 down and back (2021)
 speak to me wordlessly (2022)
 Invisible At Will (2022)
 the Living Wind (2022)
 Burn (2022)
 bloom (2022)
 In the Likeness of Oak (2022)
 He Shall Have It (2022)
 Murmuring Endearments (2022)
 In The Long Ago (2022)
 The Undifferentiated Waters (2022)
 The Dreadful Winds (2022)
 Half Of A Two Headed Creature (2022)
 Turn Pretty Flower Towards The Sun (2023)

External links
 Partial discography at Discogs
 Partial discography at RateYourMusic
 The bands official website containing a number of their releases at bullofheaven.com
 Bull of Heaven's official youtube channel 
Discographies of American artists